Božo Škerlj (28 September 1908 – 10 November 1961) was a Slovene anthropologist, author of eleven books and over 200 scientific articles published in journals at home and abroad.

Škerlj was born in Vienna in 1908. He studied biology and geography at the University of Ljubljana and graduated in 1926. He then specialized in Prague and Brno and later in Germany and Norway. In 1944 he was interred in Dachau concentration camp and after the end of the Second World War became professor at the University in Ljubljana. He died in 1961 in Ljubljana.

He won the Levstik Award in 1955 for his travelogue Neznana Amerika (Unknown America).

Selected published works

 Razvoj živega sveta (The Development of Life), with Jovan Hadži and Anton Polenec, 1947
 Splošna antropologija v osnovnih potezah (General Anthropology in Basic Terms), 1948
 Razvoj človeka (antropogeneza) (The Development of Man (Anthropogeny)), 1950
 Neznana Amerika (Unknown America), 1952
 Ljudstva brez kovin (Peoples Without Metal), 1962
 Palme, piramide in puščave (Palms, Pyramids and Deserts), 1956
 Misleči dvonožec (The Thinking Biped), 1963

References 

1908 births
1961 deaths
Slovenian anthropologists
Levstik Award laureates
Dachau concentration camp survivors
University of Ljubljana alumni
Academic staff of the University of Ljubljana
20th-century anthropologists